Rosalyn Baxandall ( Fraad; June 12, 1939 – October 13, 2015) was an American historian of women's activism and feminist activist.

Early life and education
Baxandall was born in New York City on June 12, 1939. Her father, Lewis M. Fraad, was chairman of the Department of Pediatrics at Bronx Municipal Hospital, and Assistant Dean of the Albert Einstein College of Medicine. Her mother, Irma London Fraad, was a curator of Middle Eastern Art at the Brooklyn Museum. She had two sisters, Harriet Fraad Wolff (born 1941) and Julie Fraad (born 1948).

Baxandall's maternal great-uncle, Meyer London, was a U.S. Congressional Representative elected on the Socialist Party ticket in 1915. He was one of 50 Congressmen and six Senators to oppose U.S. entry into World War I. Rosalyn's uncle, Ephraim London, a labor lawyer, was a distinguished civil libertarian and legal scholar.

She attended Riverdale Country Day School and then Hunter High School, graduating in 1957. After high school she attended Smith College for one year and then the University of Wisconsin from which she graduated with a major in French in 1961. While at the university, she was active in a struggle for racial integration in housing.

Early career and feminist activism
Baxandall began to work for Mobilization for Youth, a service organization on the lower east side of New York City founded by Frances Fox Piven and Richard Cloward in 1961, where she led youth groups and started a day care center. She translated French articles for the New Left journals Liberation and Viet Report.

A leader from the earliest days of the New York City women's liberation movement, Baxandall was a founding member of New York Radical Women, established in 1967, which published the well-known Notes from the First Year and Notes from the Second Year. She was also a member of Redstockings, created in 1969; WITCH (the Women's International Terrorist Conspiracy from Hell), which arose as a split-off from New York Radical Women, emphasizing political rather than personal change; No More Nice Girls; and CARASA (Coalition for Abortion Rights and Against Sterilization Abuse).".

She was a member of the east-coast Marxist Feminist Group #1, an informal discussion group of scholars on socialist feminism. Shortly after her son was born, she and other parents founded Liberation Nursery, a cooperative that continues as a daycare center today. In 1968, Baxandall appeared on the nationally syndicated David Susskind show with fellow feminists Kate Millett, Anselma Del'Olio and Jacqui Ceballoss.  She was also the first speaker at the historic abortion speak-out at Washington Square Methodist Church in 1969.

Career
Baxandall was among the early faculty, starting in 1971, at the new campus of the State University of New York at Old Westbury (SUNY). Beginning as Associate Professor of American Studies, in 1990 she became a full professor there.  In 2004 she was awarded a Distinguished Teaching Professorship.  She retired in 2012.  Upon her retirement, a scholarship was established in her name and that of Barbara Joseph (the Rosalyn Baxandall and Barbara Joseph Scholarship).

After retirement, she taught at the Labor Studies Program of the City University of New York (CUNY) as well as in a women's prison, Bayview Correctional Facility in Manhattan, through the Bard Prison Initiative.

She was a frequent speaker and commentator on women's liberation, women's activist history, and radical activist movements. Especially in her later years, she was a champion for the rights of Palestinians, a commitment that led her to edit an anthology of films about the Palestine-Israel conflict.

Publications
Her books include: 
 
 
   (revised ed. 1995)
 

Baxandall wrote many articles for magazines and journals, including Second-Wave Soundings with co-author Linda Gordon in The Nation and Re-Visioning the Women's Liberation Movement's Narrative: Early Second Wave African American Feminists in Feminist Studies, as well as authoring the pamphlet, Women and Abortion: The Body as Battleground.

Her work is also in several anthologies, including A Companion to American Women's History; Red Diapers: Growing Up in the Communist Left; Technology, the Labor Process and the Working Class: Essays; and the Encyclopedia of the American Left. She wrote an introduction to a new collection of works by Clara Zetkin, Clara Zetkin: Selected Writings.

Baxandall was interviewed in the 2005 film by Gillian Aldrich and Jennifer Baumgardner, I Had An Abortion.

Some of her papers on the women's liberation movement are available in the Duke University Library Special Collections; Papers from her work with Linda Gordon are housed in the Tamiment Library and the Robert F. Wagner Labor Archives at New York University. An extensive collection of her papers, interviews, and letters are in a collection at Radcliffe Library at Harvard University.

Personal life
At the University of Wisconsin, she met Lee Baxandall, to whom she was married from 1962 until they divorced in 1978. Together, they had one son, Phineas Baxandall.

After leaving Madison, Rosalyn and Lee Baxandall spent some time in Germany, Hungary and Poland, where Lee pursued his interests in radical theater and European Marxism. The experience solidified their convictions that the Soviet system did not offer an alternative. Moving back to New York, she enrolled in the Columbia University School of Social Work from which she received a Master of Social Work (MSW).

Rosalyn Baxandall's maternal cousin was Sheila Michaels, also a remarkable feminist in her own right, whom Ephraim London never publicly acknowledged as his daughter.

Death
After a 2015 diagnosis of kidney cancer, she left the hospital and held a party to say goodbye to the hundred attendees. She died on October 13, 2015 at her home in New York City.

References

External links
 Rosalyn Baxandall, Social Archive
Tully-Crenshaw Feminist Oral History Project Records, 1961-2001. MC 548. Schlesinger Library, Radcliffe Institute, Harvard University, Cambridge, Mass.
Papers of Rosalyn Baxandall, 1933-2015: A Finding Aid. Schlesinger Library, Radcliffe Institute, Harvard University.

1939 births
2015 deaths
20th-century American historians
20th-century American women writers
21st-century American historians
21st-century American women writers
American women historians
City University of New York faculty
Columbia University School of Social Work alumni
Deaths from kidney cancer
Deaths from cancer in New York (state)
Feminist historians
Historians from New York (state)
New York (state) socialists
New York Radical Women members
People from Manhattan
Redstockings members
Riverdale Country School alumni
Smith College alumni
American socialist feminists
State University of New York at Old Westbury faculty
University of Wisconsin–Madison College of Letters and Science alumni
Writers from Manhattan